Severouralsk (lit. As of the 2010 Census, its population was 29,263.

History
It was founded in 1758 due to the construction of a cast iron and copper-smelting factory. In 1931, the Soviets discovered a large deposit of bauxites in the area, followed by discovery of other deposits. Severouralsk was granted town status in 1944 after a number of surrounding settlements had been integrated into it.

Administrative and municipal status
Within the framework of the administrative divisions, it is, together with eight rural localities, incorporated as the Town of Severouralsk—an administrative unit with the status equal to that of the districts. As a municipal division, the Town of Severouralsk is incorporated as Severouralsky Urban Okrug.

Transportation
The town is served by the Severouralsk Airport.

See also
Sevuralboksitruda

References

Notes

Sources

Cities and towns in Sverdlovsk Oblast
Populated places established in 1758
Monotowns in Russia